Brewer & Shipley are an American folk rock duo who enjoyed their peak success in the late 1960s through the 1970s, consisting of singer-songwriters Mike Brewer (born on April 14, 1944) and Tom Shipley (born on April 1, 1941). They were known for their intricate guitar work, vocal harmonies, and socially conscious lyrics which reflected the concerns of their generation – especially the Vietnam War, and the struggles for personal and political freedom. Their greatest commercial success was the song "One Toke Over the Line" from their 1970 album Tarkio. They had two other singles on the Billboard charts: "Tarkio Road" (1970) and "Shake Off The Demon" (1971). They continue to perform, both separately and together, usually in the Midwest United States.

Early history 
The two Midwestern natives crossed paths numerous times at various coffeehouse gigs before settling in Los Angeles to write music together in 1968, producing their first two albums, Down in L.A. and Weeds. Even though mutual friends in bands such as The Association and Buffalo Springfield lived in Los Angeles, they left California during 1969, returning to Kansas City, Missouri, where they made a meager living playing college towns. They derived the name of their next album, Tarkio, from a regular gig they played in Tarkio, Missouri. This album was their most successful commercially, featuring the song "One Toke Over the Line", which they wrote as a joke while preparing backstage for a performance.

"One Toke Over The Line" was performed on The Lawrence Welk Show, a television program known for its conservative, family-oriented format, by a duo known as "Gail and Dale". At the conclusion of the performance of the song, Welk remarked, without any hint of irony, "There you've heard a modern spiritual by Gail and Dale." This caused Michael Brewer to comment:
The Vice President of the United States, Spiro Agnew, named us personally as a subversive to American youth, but at exactly the same time Lawrence Welk performed the crazy thing and introduced it as a gospel song. That shows how absurd it really is. Of course, we got more publicity than we could have paid for.

Brewer & Shipley have performed with many notable acts, including Stephen Stills, Bruce Springsteen, Black Sabbath, and Jerry Garcia of the Grateful Dead, who played pedal steel guitar for "Oh, Mommy".

Regrouping, touring, and present-day status 
During 1989 they performed a gig together, and a brief time later began composing together again, producing two albums, SHANGHAI (1993) and Heartland (1997). They have continued to tour together, part-time, since the 1990s. In 2011, the acoustic duo performed on Main Street in Tarkio, Missouri, to commemorate the 40th Anniversary of the Tarkio album. At present, Michael Brewer lives outside of Branson, Missouri. Tom Shipley lives in Rolla, Missouri, where he is part of the staff of Missouri University of Science & Technology (formerly the University of Missouri – Rolla).  He is semi-retired as manager of video productions and continues to work on special video productions for the university. He is a member of Engineers Without Borders and has traveled twice to the Amazon and Andes of Bolivia to produce videos for the organization. One Toke Over the Line . . . and Still Smokin', a documentary on Brewer and Shipley, was released on Vimeo on Demand on April 20, 2021.

Discography

Albums 
Down in L.A. (1968) on A&M Records
Weeds (1969) on Kama Sutra Records
Tarkio (1970) on Kama Sutra Records, US Billboard # 30
Shake Off the Demon (1971) on Kama Sutra Records, US Billboard # 164
Rural Space (1972) on Kama Sutra Records, US Billboard # 174
ST11261 (1974) on Capitol Records, US Billboard # 185
Welcome To Riddle Bridge (1975) on Capitol Records, US Billboard # 202
Brewer and Shipley Greatest Hits (1989) on Pair Records
SHANGHAI (1993) on One Toke Productions
Archive Alive! (1997) on Archive Recordings
Heartland (1997) on One Toke Productions
One Toke Over the Line: The Best of Brewer & Shipley (2001) on Buddah Records

EPs 
Kama Sutra Records LP Sampler, 1970

Singles 
"Keeper of the Keys" / "I Can't See Her" (A&M 905, 1968)
"Truly Right" / "Green Bamboo" (A&M 938, 1968)
"Time and Changes" / "Dreamin' in the Shade" (A&M 996, 1968)
"Rise Up Easy Rider" / "Boomerang" (Buddah 154, 1969)
"People Love Each Other" / "Witchi-Tai-To" (Kama Sutra 512, 1970)
"One Toke Over the Line" / "Oh Mommy" (Kama Sutra 516, 1971), US Billboard # 10, US Cash Box # 8, Canada # 5
"Tarkio Road" / "Seems Like A Long Time" (Kama Sutra 524, 1971), US Billboard # 55, US Cash Box # 39, Canada # 41
"Shake Off the Demon" / "Indian Summer" (Kama Sutra 539, 1972), US Billboard # 98
"Yankee Lady" / "Natural Child" (Kama Sutra 547, 1972), US Cash Box # 90
"Black Sky" (mono) / "Black Sky" (stereo) (Kama Sutra 567 promo, 1973)
"Fair Play" (mono) / "Fair Play" (stereo) (Capitol 3933 promo, 1974)
"Brain Damage" (mono) / "Brain Damage" (stereo) (Capital 4105 promo, 1975)
Reissue singles
"One Toke Over the Line" / "Oh Mommy" (Flashback BF10)
"One Toke Over the Line" / "Tarkio Road" (Collectables 3515)
"People Love Each Other" / "Witchi-Tai-To" (Radio Active Gold RD-74, 1978)
"One Toke Over the Line" / "Oh Mommy" (Radio Active Gold RD-75 1978)
"Indian Summer" / "Song from Platte River" (Radio Active Gold RD-77, 1978)

In popular culture 
In the first chapter of Hunter S. Thompson's novel Fear and Loathing in Las Vegas, Raoul Duke's attorney, Dr. Gonzo, sings the line "One toke over the line, sweet Jesus, one toke over the line" while the two of them drive from Barstow to Las Vegas.
One Toke Over the Line is an addiction status in the video game Grand Theft Auto IV.
Shipley, a cat featured in Tom Cox's Under the Paw, Confessions of a Cat Man is named after Tom Shipley.
In the movie St. Vincent (2014) the song "One Toke Over the Line" is heard playing on Bill Murray's headphones and is listed on the soundtrack credits.

See also 
 List of 1970s one-hit wonders in the United States

References

Further reading

External links 
Official website
YouTube posting of Lawrence Welk version, 1971

Musical groups from Missouri
American male singers
American folk rock groups
American musical duos
Folk rock duos
Singers from Missouri
A&M Records artists
Capitol Records artists
Kama Sutra Records artists